The Feng Zikai Chinese Children's Picture Book Award (trad. Chin.: 豐子愷兒童圖畫書獎) is a biannual award aimed at promoting original, quality Chinese children's books and recognising the efforts of authors, illustrators and publishers.  The Award is named after one of China's best-known illustrators, Feng Zikai (1898-1975). It is the first international Chinese children's picture book award.

The Award is sponsored by the Chen Yet-Sen Family Foundation, a Hong Kong-based charitable institution, which supports childhood literacy projects. The first awards were made in July 2009 and, thereafter, every other year.

The Award is comparable to the Caldecott Medal, which honours the most distinguished American picture book for children published in the United States each year.

Background
The best children's picture books in the Chinese-speaking world are often translated from foreign languages.  As a result, they may not always be relevant to the experiences of Chinese children.  The Feng Zikai Award is aimed at addressing the current inadequacy of high quality, original Chinese picture books.

The Award recognises the achievements of writers and illustrators of Chinese children's picture books.  By doing so, it hopes to encourage the production and distribution of high quality children's picture books.

Recognising the importance of reading in a child's development, the Feng Zikai Award also aims to promote reading and to help develop a reading culture amongst children in the Chinese-speaking world.

Prizes
The main prize will go to the winner of the "Best Children's Book Award", who will be awarded a cash prize of US$20,000. The organiser will also purchase 3,000 copies of the winning book, which will be distributed amongst schools.

The "Judging Panel's Recommended Illustration Award" and the "Judging Panel's Recommended Writing Award" winners will each receive a cash prize of US$10,000.

In addition, the "Outstanding Children's Picture Book Award" will be given to 10 authors who will each win US$1,000.

Prize winners

The 7th Awards, 2021 

Best Chinese Children's Picture Book Award - winner

 "Sudan's Rhino Horn" 《蘇丹的犀角》 by author Dai Yun 戴芸 and illustrator Li Xingming 李星明

Outstanding Chinese Children's Picture Book Award
 "Happy Birthday" 《生日快樂》by Adeline Ko 高佩聰 (author and illustrator) 
 "Button Soldier" 《鈕扣士兵》by Jiu’er 九兒 (author and illustrator)
 "Little Bear, Run" 《小熊，快跑》by author Shi Lei 史雷 and illustrator Ma Penghao 馬鵬浩
 "Dung Beetle’s Birthday Present"《糞金龜的生日禮物》 by author Gong Wei Guo 龔衛國 and illustrator Tao Ju Xiang 陶菊香

The 6th Awards, 2019 
Judges: Sarah Ko, Fang Weiping, Sandra Lee, Hsu Su-hsia, Meilo So, Chen En Li, Ji Zhao Hua

Best Chinese Children's Picture Book Award - winner

 "About the Grandmother's Horse"《外婆家的马》 by Xie Hua 谢华 (author) and Huang Li 黄丽 (illustrator)

Outstanding Chinese Children's Picture Book Award

 "A Maverick Piggy" 《一个特立独行的猪》by Zhang Ning 张宁 (author and illustrator) 
 "Under the Same Moon" 《同一个月亮》by Jimmy Liao 几米 (author and illustrator)  
 "The Flyaway Tickets" 《车票去哪里了？》by Hsu-Kung Liu 刘旭恭 (author and illustrator)  
 "Let's Go to the Zoo, My Dear Brother" 《一起去动物园》 by Lin Po Ting 林柏廷

The 5th Awards, 2017 
Best Chinese Children's Picture Book Award - winner

"Where Does Rice Come From?" 《盘中餐》 by Yu Hongcheng 于虹呈(author and illustrator)

Outstanding Chinese Children's Picture Book Award

 "Where is the Hero?" 《杯杯英雄》by Chao-Lun Tsai 蔡兆伦 (author and illustrator)
 "Waiting" 《等待》by Adeline Ko 高佩聪 (author and illustrator)
 "Grandma Lin's Peach Tree" 《林桃奶奶的桃子树》 by Tom Liu 汤姆牛 (author and illustrator)
 "Excursions of Tortoise Family" 《佳作奖》by Zhang Ning 张宁 (author and illustrator)

The 4th Awards, 2015 
Best Chinese Children's Picture Book Award - winner
"Kata, Kata, Kata" 《喀噠喀噠喀噠》by Bei Lynn  林小杯 – author and illustrator
Outstanding Chinese Children's Picture Book Award
"Granny couldn't fall asleep" 《棉婆婆睡不着》by Liao Xiaoqin  廖小琴 (author) and Zhu Chengliang  朱成梁 (illustrator)

"Tooth, tooth, throw it on the roof" 《牙齿牙齿扔屋顶》by Liu Xun  劉洵 (author and illustrator)
"The little magpie and the rocky hill" 《小喜鹊和岩石山》by Liu Ching-Yen  刘清彦 (author) and Chao-Lun Tsai  蔡兆伦 (illustrator)
"The crutch dog" 《拐杖狗》by Lee Ru-Qing  李如青 (author and illustrator)

The 3rd Awards, 2013 
Best Chinese Children's Picture Book Award - winner
"I see a bird" 《我看见一只鸟》by Liu Bor-Leh  刘伯乐 – author and illustrator
Outstanding Chinese Children's Picture Book Award
"The very slow snail"《很慢很慢的蝸牛》 by Chih-Yuan Chen (author and illustrator)  陈致元 (author and illustrator)
"Ali loves animals" 《阿里愛動物》by Li-Huang Huang  黄丽凰  (author) and Chih-Ming Huang  黄志民 (illustrator)
"I can't see" 《看不見》by Chao-Lun Tsai  蔡兆伦 (author and illustrator)
"The scariest day of my life" 《最可怕的一天》 by Tom Liu (Chen-Kuo Liu)  汤姆牛 (author and illustrator)

The 2nd Awards, 2011 
Judging Panel’s Recommended Award
"Going to the Marketplace"《進城》by Cookie Lin  林秀穗 (author) and Chien-Hung Liao  廖健宏 (illustrator)
"Door"《門》by Tao Juxiang  陶菊香 (author and illustrator)
"It’s Raining!"《下雨了！》by Tom Liu (Chen-Kuo Liu)  汤姆牛 (author and illustrator)
"Infatuated with Peking Opera"《迷戲》by Yao Hong (author and illustrator)  姚红 (author and illustrator)
"The Frog and the Boy" 《青蛙與男孩》by Xiao Mao  萧袤 (author), Chen Wei (illustrator)  陈伟 (illustrator) and Huang Xiaomin (illustrator)  黃小敏 (illustrator)

The 1st Awards, 2009 
Best Chinese Children’s Picture Book Award
"A New Year's Reunion" by  Yu Liqiong  余丽琼 (author) and Zhu Chengliang  朱成梁 (illustrator) 
This inaugural winner was translated into English and published by Candlewick (US) and Walker Books (UK). In 2011 it was selected as one of the New York Times Book Review’s 10 Best Illustrated Books of the Year.

Judging Panel’s Recommended Writing Award
The King of Hide and Seek《躲貓貓大王》 by Zhang Xiaoling (author)  张晓玲 (author) and Pan Jian  潘坚 (illlustrator)
The Day Vegetables Became Goblins《一園青菜成了精》by Zhou Xiang (author and illustrator)  周翔 (author and illustrator)
Outstanding Children’s Picture Book Award
"The Morning Market at Lotus Town"《荷花鎮的早市》by Zhou Xiang (author and illustrator)  周翔 (author and illustrator)
"Me and My Bike"《我和我的腳踏車》by Ye Ande  叶安德 (author and illustrator)
"An’s Seeds" 《安的種子》by Wang Zaozao  王早早 (author) and Huang Li (illustrator)  黄丽 (illustrator)
"I’ve Become a Fire Breathing Dragon!"《我變成一隻噴火龍了!》by Laima (author and illustrator)  賴馬 (author and illustrator)
"Now Do You Know Who I Am?"《現在，你知道我是誰了嗎?》by Laima (author and illustrator)  賴馬 (author and illustrator)
"A Wednesday Afternoon, Chasing Tadpoles"《星期三下午，捉‧蝌‧蚪》An Shih-liu  安石榴 (author and illustrator)
"I Want to Be Different"《想要不一樣》by Tong Jia  童嘉 (author and illustrator)
"On the Pond, Under the Pond"《池上池下》by Chiu Chen-tsung  邱承宗 (author and illustrator)
"Xi Xi"《西西》by Xiao Mao  萧袤 (author), Li Chunmiao  李春苗 (illustrator) and Zhang Yanhong  张彦红 (illustrator)

References

External links

Charities based in Hong Kong
Picture book awards
Chinese children's literature
Chinese children's writers
Chinese children's literary awards
Children's literary awards